Euonymus verrucosus is a species of flowering plant belonging to the family Celastraceae.

Its native range is Central Europe to Central Japan.

References

verrucosus